Yuichi Watanabe is a Japanese mixed martial artist and professional wrestler. He competed in Shooto's Lightweight division and was the inaugural Shooto Lightweight Champion defeating Kazuhiro Kusayanagi. 
As a pro wrestler he competes for Real Japan Pro Wrestling under the name Super Rider. He has also wrestled for notable promotions such as W*ING, Big Japan Pro Wrestling, IWA Japan, Battlarts, Dramatic Dream Team, Pro Wrestling KAGEKI, Pro Wrestling ZERO-1 and Diamond Ring.

Background and career
Watanabe trained under Satoru Sayama in Shooto and was also one of his first trainees at his Seikendo school. He also learned shootboxing under Caesar Takeshi, was an amateur wrestling champion in high school, was the captain of his high school club wrestling club with Mitsuharu Misawa as his vice-captain and Toshiaki Kawada as his junior, competed in the 1984 All Japan Student Wrestling Championships representing Nihon University losing to future Olympic medalist Kosei Akaishi in the finals in the 68 kg freestyle division, and also trained in sambo and judo. Watanabe initially worked as a trainer at Shooting Gym Mobara, as well as an instructor for Sayama's Seikendo school. He now runs the Super Tiger Gym Gunma as a head trainer.

Personal life
Watanabe is the father of professional MMA fighters Kenshiro and Shuto "Shooto" Watanabe.

Championships and accomplishments
 Shooto
Shooto Lightweight Championship (1 time, inaugural champion)

Mixed martial arts record

|-
| Win
| align=center| 6–3
| Naoki Sakurada
| Submission (kneebar)
| Shooto - Shooto
| 
| align=center| 3
| align=center| 0:57
| Tokyo, Japan
| 
|-
| Win
| align=center| 5–3
| Tomonori Ohara
| Submission (kneebar)
| Shooto - Shooto
| 
| align=center| 1
| align=center| 0:00
| Tokyo, Japan
| 
|-
| Loss
| align=center| 4–3
| Naoki Sakurada
| Submission (armbar)
| Shooto - Shooto
| 
| align=center| 5
| align=center| 2:03
| Tokyo, Japan
| 
|-
| Win
| align=center| 4–2
| Kazuhiro Kusayanagi
| Submission (kneebar)
| Shooto - Shooto
| 
| align=center| 1
| align=center| 0:00
| Tokyo, Japan
| 
|-
| Win
| align=center| 3–2
| Tomonori Ohara
| Decision (unanimous)
| Shooto - Shooto
| 
| align=center| 5
| align=center| 3:00
| Tokyo, Japan
| 
|-
| Loss
| align=center| 2–2
| Yuji Ito
| TKO (punches)
| Shooto - Shooto
| 
| align=center| 3
| align=center| 1:49
| Tokyo, Japan
| 
|-
| Win
| align=center| 2–1
| Kazuhiro Sakamoto
| Submission (armbar)
| Shooto - Shooto
| 
| align=center| 2
| align=center| 2:54
| Tokyo, Japan
|
|-
| Loss
| align=center| 1–1
| Naoki Sakurada
| Submission (heel hook)
| Shooto - Shooto
| 
| align=center| 1
| align=center| 0:00
| Tokyo, Japan
|  
|-
| Win
| align=center| 1–0
| Yuji Ito
| Submission (armbar)
| Shooto - Shooto
| 
| align=center| 1
| align=center| 0:00
| Tokyo, Japan
|

See also
List of male mixed martial artists

References

External links
 
 Yuichi Watanabe at mixedmartialarts.com

Japanese male professional wrestlers
Japanese male mixed martial artists
Lightweight mixed martial artists
Mixed martial artists utilizing shootboxing
Mixed martial artists utilizing shoot wrestling
Mixed martial artists utilizing catch wrestling
Mixed martial artists utilizing sambo
Mixed martial artists utilizing judo
Japanese sambo practitioners
Japanese male judoka
Living people
Year of birth missing (living people)